Rafflesia leonardi is a parasitic plant species of the genus Rafflesia. It is endemic to the Philippines. Rafflesia banaoana is considered to be a synonym by some sources, but is recognized as a separate species by others. R. leonardi is the fourth Rafflesia species found in Luzon and the eighth from the Philippines. It is called ngaratngat by the local Agta tribesmen.

The species was discovered in May 2008 by Cagayan Valley Partners in People Development (Cavapped), a multi-sectoral group of environmental scientists at remote sitio Kinapawan in the coastal town of Lal-Lo, Cagayan.

Rafflesia leonardi was named by Julie Barcelona and colleagues after the murdered Filipino botanist Dr. Leonardo Co of Conservation International. See this citation for a review of Philippine Rafflesia.

References

External links
'A striking work of nature': the search for a rare flower in the Philippines jungle – The Guardian

leonardi
Parasitic plants
Endemic flora of the Philippines
Flora of Luzon
Taxa named by Julie F. Barcelona
Taxa named by Pieter B. Pelser
Plants described in 2008